The 1969 Copa Libertadores Finals were the two-legged final that decided the winner of the 1969 Copa Libertadores, the 10th edition of the Copa Libertadores de América, South America's premier international club football tournament organized by CONMEBOL.

The finals were contested in two-legged home-and-away format between Argentine team Estudiantes de La Plata
and Uruguayan team Nacional. The first leg was hosted by Nacional at Estadio Centenario of Montevideo on May 15, 1969, while the second leg was played at Estudiantes Stadium in La Plata on May 22, 1969.

Estudiantes won the series 3-0 on aggregate, winning their 2nd title Copa Libertadores.

Qualified teams

Venues

Match details

First leg

Second leg

References

1969
1
l
l
1969 in Uruguayan football
1969 in Argentine football
Football in Buenos Aires Province
Football in Montevideo